Ploshchad Lenina (Lenin Square) is a station on the Kirovsko-Vyborgskaya Line of the Saint Petersburg Metro, located between Chernyshevskaya and Vyborgskaya.  The station was opened on June 1, 1958, on the second line of the metro between Ploshchad Vosstaniya and Ploshchad Lenina.  It was named after Lenin Square, the location of its surface vestibule. In the early plans, it was named "Finland Station."

Surface vestibules 
The surface vestibule of the station was designed by architect A.K. Andreev. It was built into the  Finlyandsky Rail Terminal building.  The wall of the entrance hall is decorated with a panoramic mosaic that commemorates Lenin's speech before the workers and soldiers of Petrograd on April 3, 1917.  It was created by artists A.I. Mylnikov and A.L. Korolyov.

In 1962, Andreev worked together with Yu.N. Kozlov and the engineer Ye.A. Erganov to design and complete second entrance from Botkinskoy street.  Both entrances are served by three escalators.

Architecture and decoration 
Ploshchad Lenina is a deep underground pylon station at  depth.  The underground hall was designed by architect A.K. Andreev.

The station's theme commemorated Lenin's return from Finland to Petrograd in June 1917. Like the Chernyshevskaya station, completed in the period when Soviet architects tried to move away from architectural excesses of Stalinist era. As the result, the station is plain, somewhat bare bones and inexpressive. The station used the contrasting red and white tones as its color scheme.  The platform hall is faced with marble.  On the platform walls are decorative grilles with the inscription "1958," the year the station was opened.  In 2006 the lighting of the station was redone, with mercury lamps replaced by sodium lamps.  On one hand, the station gained a brighter look, but on the other hand the color palette was entirely changed.

See also 
 Ploshchad Lenina (Minsk Metro)
 Ploshchad Lenina (Novosibirsk Metro)

External links

 
 

Saint Petersburg Metro stations
Railway stations in Russia opened in 1958
1958 establishments in the Soviet Union
Railway stations located underground in Russia